Gary Peter Waldhorn (3 July 1943 – 10 January 2022) was an English actor and comedian known for his roles in British television and theatre. He is particularly remembered for his work in the main casts of several British sitcoms. Notable roles and characters played by him included Councillor David Horton in The Vicar of Dibley and Lionel Bainbridge in Brush Strokes.

Early life
Waldhorn was born in London on 3 July 1943 to Liselotte ( Popper) and Siegfried Waldhorn. His parents were Austrian Jews. He studied acting at the Yale School of Drama (graduated 1967) where he notably performed in new works written by playwright Lillian Hellman in 1966. While at Yale he met fellow student Christie Dickason, daughter of Indiana University academic David Howard Dickason, who became his wife and an active theatre director and choreographer in London and later a published playwright and novelist. He is known for his work in West End theatre productions and for his collaborations with the Royal Shakespeare Company. In 1972 he toured Australia and New Zealand in Harry M. Miller's production of Sleuth playing opposite Richard Todd.

Career
Apart from appearing in The Vicar of Dibley, Waldhorn also made many television appearances from the 1970s including Softly, Softly, The Sweeney, Space: 1999, The New Avengers, Brideshead Revisited, The Professionals, Minder, Robin of Sherwood, Rumpole of the Bailey, The Bill, Heartbeat, Gallowglass and Lovejoy. He also played Lionel Bainbridge in the first three series of Brush Strokes before the character was written out, and Richard Beamish in the first series of All at No 20.

He also starred as Ralph Apsoland in the 1993 miniseries Gallowglass. His other notable television credits include several recurring roles: Caulaincourt in the mini-series Napoleon and Love, Greville in The Top Secret Life of Edgar Briggs, Henry Channon in Edward & Mrs. Simpson, Teddy Lupus in Enemy at the Door, John Fearnley in Moving, Gordon Lochhead in Campaign, Cllr. Alec Radcliffe in The Chief, Sergeant Bob Pulver in Lovejoy, and Cmdre. Forrest in Longitude. His film credits include the roles of Harlich in Zeppelin, Max in Sir Henry at Rawlinson End, Hauptmann Rainer Mueller in Escape to Victory, and Tornado in The Chain. On stage he was particularly active with the Royal Shakespeare Company.

Personal life and death
Waldhorn was a patron of Malawi Dream, a British registered charity working to help the people of Malawi in Africa.  

He married Christie Dickason on 2 April 1967; together they had one son, Joshua.  

Waldhorn died on 10 January 2022, at the age of 78.

Selected filmography

Television

Films
 Zeppelin (1971) – Harlich
 Hanover Street (1979) – 2nd German Clerk
 Dirty Money (1979) – Ministry Man
 Sir Henry at Rawlinson End (1980) – Max
 Escape to Victory (1981) – Hauptmann Rainer Mueller
 The Chain (1984) – Tornado

Radio
 "The Carrara Cherub", BBC Radio 4, Saturday Night Theatre, 21 August 1982 - Ray Damon (Private Detective)

References

External links

1943 births
2022 deaths
20th-century English male actors
21st-century English male actors
British male comedy actors
English male film actors
English male stage actors
English male television actors
Male actors from London
Royal Shakespeare Company members
Yale School of Drama alumni
English people of Austrian-Jewish descent
People from Paddington
Jewish English male actors
20th-century British Jews
21st-century British Jews